Indian Run is a tributary to Neshannock Creek in western Pennsylvania.  The stream rises in south-central Mercer County and flows southeast entering Neshannock Creek at Leesburg, Pennsylvania. The watershed is roughly 61% agricultural, 32% forested and the rest is other uses.

References

Rivers of Pennsylvania
Tributaries of the Beaver River
Rivers of Mercer County, Pennsylvania